

History

Shaikh Paltu (Hindi: शैख़ पलटू) was a soldier (sepoy) with the British East India Company who served in the 34th Bengal Native Infantry in March 1857, shortly before widespread discontent broke out in the Bengal Army. When on March 29, Sepoy Mangal Pandey of the same regiment attacked a British lieutenant, Shaikh Paltu intervened to assist the officer. The other sepoys of the quarter guard on duty and others present refused to take any action against their comrade and remained as "idle spectators of a murderous assault".

An English sergeant-major had been first to arrive at the scene but was knocked down by the musket of a member of the quarter-guard. While other sepoys looked on, Shaikh Paltu continued to defend the two  British officers, calling upon other soldiers to join him. Shaikh Paltu grabbed Mangal Pandey and held him around the waist. A number of off-duty sepoys had crowded around the struggle and some abused and struck at Shaikh Paltu. The intervention of the latter did however enable Adjutant Baugh and Lieutenant Hewson, both injured, to rise. Some members of the quarter-guard detachment are reported to have attacked their officers with the butts of their muskets.

Major-General J. Hearse, who, with other officers, had ridden to the scene took control of the situation. Pandey shot and wounded himself, and the members of the quarter-guard now obeyed orders. Mangal  Pandey "shivering and convulsed" with a chest wound was taken to the regimental hospital under guard.

Aftermath
Pandey and the jemander in command of the guard were subsequently court-martialed and executed. The 34th Bengal Native Infantry was disarmed and disbanded six weeks later on May 6.

Shaikh Paltu was promoted to Havaldar (native sergeant) a day after Mangal Pandey's execution and recommended by General Hearse for a decoration. However, some days before the disbandment of the 34th BNI (Bengal Native Infantry), he was lured to an isolated spot in the cantonment and murdered by several of his former comrades.

In popular culture

Films and television

In the 2005 Bollywood Hindi movie Mangal Pandey: The Rising, directed by Ketan Mehta, Shaikh Paltu was portrayed by Murali Sharma.

References

Suggested readings 

 Malleson, G.B., The Indian Mutiny of 1857, pp. 36–39, Delhi, Rupa & Co. publishers, 2005 (first published: 1890)

External links 
 The Great Mutiny: India's War for Freedom

British East India Company Army soldiers
Indian people of the Indian Rebellion of 1857